Archie Lindo (20 January 1908 – 2 April 1990) was a Jamaican photographer, actor, author,  playwright, and radio show broadcaster. He was one of the most successful Jamaican playwrights of the 1940s. His photographs are part of the National Gallery of Jamaica collection. He received the Silver Musgrave Medal from the Institute of Jamaica as well as an Order of Distinction from the government. He was also an art critic for The Star from 1960.

Lindo was a member of the Poetry League of Jamaica and was a columnist for The Gleaner. Left in charge of Jamaica's only radio station at the time, ZQI, he broadcast local programming including Louise Bennett and the Jamaica Military Band. The radio station was succeeded by RJR.

Bibliography
Under the Skin, a play
The Maroon, a play

References

Jamaican dramatists and playwrights
Jamaican photographers
Jamaican radio presenters
20th-century Jamaican male actors
Recipients of the Order of Distinction
Jamaican male poets
Jamaican journalists
Recipients of the Musgrave Medal
1908 births
1990 deaths
Place of birth missing
Place of death missing
20th-century journalists